LIM/homeobox protein Lhx2 is a protein that in humans is encoded by the LHX2 gene.

This gene encodes a protein belonging to a large protein family, members of which carry the LIM domain, a unique cysteine-rich zinc-binding domain. The encoded protein may function as a transcriptional regulator. The protein can recapitulate or rescue phenotypes in Drosophila caused by a related protein, suggesting conservation of function during evolution.

Interactions
LHX2 has been shown to interact with CITED2.

References

Further reading